The Tandur Test Range is an outdoor trial field being built by the Indian Defence Research and Development Organisation (Drdo) for the development of electronic warfare systems. It is spread over an area of 8000 acres of land. It is located in the Tandur district of Telangana, 135 km away from Hyderabad.
The project is being set up with a planned investment of Rs 500 Crores. As of 2010 it was expected to be operational in 2013 and will test communication electronic warfare systems.

See also
 Pashan Test Range
 Ramgarh Test Range
 Chitradurga Aeronautical Test Range

References

Ministry of Defence (India)
Defence Research and Development Organisation
Military installations of India
Weapons test sites